Adolphus Druiding (1838–1900) was a German-born American architect who was best known for his work in creating Roman Catholic churches, schools, rectories and convents. Druiding’s work along with that of fellow German immigrant Franz Georg Himpler (1833–1916) makes up the largest body of German Catholic architecture in the United States between the end of the Civil War and 1900.

Early life and career
Druiding was born May 29, 1838, in Aschendorf, a province of Hanover, Germany. He studied at the Secondary School in Papenburg and at the Polytechnic School in Munich where he graduated with honors. He worked briefly at a French architect’s office and then entered government service in Munich. After this he studied in Berlin under Strach, Adler and Local. He built one church in Schoenwalde and was employed erecting government stations in the Netherlands.

Architectural practice
In 1865 after completing his work in the Netherlands, Druiding came to the United States where he enjoyed an extensive practice in the design of Roman Catholic Churches throughout the Midwest.

Druiding was noted as an aggressive businessman who was prepared to assume projects large and small. This was quite unlike his countryman and fellow architect Franz Georg Himpler who designed far fewer buildings than Druiding, but more of Himpler's buildings survive to the present day.

Legacy
Druiding was one of perhaps 20 American architects who contributed most of the Roman Catholic ecclesiastical architecture throughout the later part of the 19th century. His church buildings are much admired locally, have been featured in books on church architecture  and have found their way to some of the National Registers.

Works

Alabama

 Cathedral of St. Paul, Birmingham, Alabama

Arkansas
 Immaculate Conception Church, Fort Smith, Arkansas

District of Columbia
 St. Anthony of Padua Church, Washington, DC

Iowa
 Blessed Sacrament Church, Sioux City, IA

New York
 St. Michael Church, Rochester, NY
 Queen of the Most Holy Rosary Church, Bridgehampton, NY
 Church of the Guardian Angel, Brooklyn, NY
 Our Lady of Sorrows Church, Buffalo, NY (now King Urban Life Center)
 Blessed Sacrament Church, Buffalo, NY

Ohio

 Immaculate Conception, Ottoville
 Sacred Heart of Jesus Church, Camp Washington, Cincinnati
 St. Charles Borromeo Church, Carthage, Cincinnati
 St. Aloysius-on-the-Ohio Church, Cincinnati
 St. Michael Church, Cleveland
 St. Henry Church, Harriettsville
 St. John the Baptist Catholic Church, Maria Stein
 St. Henry Catholic Church, St. Henry
 St. Joseph Church, Plymouth
 St. Lawrence Church, Cincinnati
 Our Lady of Perpetual Help Church, Cincinnati
 Mt. St. Joseph Sisters of Charity Convent and Mother House, Cincinnati
 St. Mary, Delaware
 Franciscan Sisters of the Poor – St. Clare Convent & Chapel near Hartwell/ Cincinnati – Springfield Township
 St. Patrick Church, Toledo

Illinois
 St. Hyacinth Church Chicago, IL (first church constructed in 1895 and replaced by much larger church by Worthmann and Steinbach)
 St. George Church, Chicago, IL
 St. John Cantius Church,  Chicago, IL
 St. Hedwig Church, Chicago, IL

Indiana
 St. Benedict Church, Terre Haute, Indiana (destroyed by fire 1930, partially rebuilt)

Kentucky
 St. Peter Church,  Lexington, KY
 St. Stephen Church, Newport, KY

Minnesota
Saint Michael Church, Saint Michael, MN

Missouri

 St. Agatha Church, St. Louis, MO
 Shrine of St. Joseph, St. Louis, MO
 St. John Nepomuk Church, St. Louis, MO
  St. Alphonsus Liguori Church,  St. Louis, MO
  St. Peter's Church, Jefferson City, MO

New Jersey
 St. Joseph Chapel, Seton Hall University, South Orange, NJ

Pennsylvania
 Ss. Peter and Paul Church, Pittsburgh, PA
 St. Joseph Church, Oil City, PA
 St. Patrick Church, Philadelphia, PA

South Dakota
 St. Paul Church,	Marty, SD

Wisconsin
 St. Francis Xavier Cathedral, Green Bay, Wisconsin
 St. Joseph's Church, Waukesha, Wisconsin
 St. Mary Oratory. Wausau, WI
 St. Mary Church, Oshkosh, WI
 St. Mary (originally “of the Immaculate Conception”) Catholic Church, Menasha, Wisconsin
 St. Mary's Church, Kaukauna, WI

References

1839 births
1900 deaths
19th-century American architects
Hanoverian emigrants to the United States
American ecclesiastical architects
Architects of Roman Catholic churches
Architects from Hanover